The men's curling tournament of the 2018 Winter Olympics was held between 14 and 24 February 2018 at the Gangneung Curling Centre. Ten nations competed in a round robin preliminary round, and the top four nations at the conclusion of the round robin qualified for the medal round.

Great Britain, Switzerland, and the United States each finished round robin play with a 5–4 record, resulting in a three-way tie for third place in the preliminary round standings.  Under Olympic tiebreaker rules then in effect, the United States was awarded the third seed in the medal round (by virtue of having defeated both Great Britain and Switzerland during the preliminary round), and Great Britain and Switzerland played a one-game tiebreaker. Switzerland prevailed 9-5 and was awarded the fourth seed.

In the gold medal match, with the score tied at 5 in the eighth end, US skip John Shuster fired a dramatic double take-out for five that left his team leading 10-5 with two ends to go, effectively sealing the win and the gold medal for the United States, which won its first gold medal in curling.

Teams
Ten teams took part in the tournament:

Round-robin standings

Round-robin results
All draw times are listed in Seoul Time (UTC+9).

Summary

Draw 1
Wednesday, 14 February, 09:05

Draw 2
Wednesday, 14 February, 20:05

Draw 3
Thursday, 15 February, 14:05

Draw 4
Friday, 16 February, 09:05

Draw 5
Friday, 16 February, 20:05

Draw 6
Saturday, 17 February, 14:05

Draw 7
Sunday, 18 February, 09:05

Draw 8
Sunday, 18 February, 20:05

Draw 9
Monday, 19 February, 14:05

Draw 10
Tuesday, 20 February, 09:05

Draw 11
Tuesday, 20 February, 20:05

Draw 12
Wednesday, 21 February, 14:05

Tiebreaker
Thursday, 22 February, 9:05

Playoffs

Semifinals
Thursday, 22 February, 20:05

Bronze medal game
Friday, 23 February, 15:35

Gold medal game
Saturday, 24 February, 15:35

Final standings
The final standings are:

Statistics

Player percentages 
Player percentages during round robin play are as follows:

Lead

Second

Third

Fourth

References

Curling at the 2018 Winter Olympics
Men's curling at the 2018 Winter Olympics
Men's events at the 2018 Winter Olympics